Scythris fallacella is a moth of the family Scythrididae found in Europe.

Description
The moth has a wingspan of circa 15 mm and are on the wing in May and June. There may be a possible second generation in August.

The larva feed within a silken web on rock-rose (Helianthemum species) and pupate in the soil.

References

fallacella
Moths of Europe
Moths described in 1847